This page is a list of San Francisco 49ers NFL Draft selections. The first draft the 49ers participated in was the 1950 NFL Draft, in which they made Leo Nomellini of Minnesota their first ever selection.

Key

1950 NFL Draft

1951 NFL Draft

1952 NFL Draft

1953 NFL Draft

1954 NFL Draft

1955 NFL Draft

1956 NFL Draft

1957 NFL Draft

1958 NFL Draft

1959 NFL Draft

1960 NFL Draft

1961 NFL Draft

1962 NFL Draft

1963 NFL Draft

1964 NFL Draft

1965 NFL Draft

1966 NFL Draft

1967 NFL/AFL Draft

1968 NFL/AFL Draft

1969 NFL Draft

1970 NFL Draft

1971 NFL Draft

1972 NFL Draft

1973 NFL Draft

1974 NFL Draft

1975 NFL Draft

1976 NFL Draft

1977 NFL Draft

1978 NFL Draft

1979 NFL Draft

1980 NFL Draft

1981 NFL Draft

1982 NFL Draft

1983 NFL Draft

1984 NFL Draft

1984 NFL Supplemental Draft of USFL and CFL players

1985 NFL Draft

1986 NFL Draft

1987 NFL Draft

1988 NFL Draft

1989 NFL Draft

1990 NFL Draft

1991 NFL Draft

1992 NFL Draft

1993 NFL Draft

1994 NFL Draft

1995 NFL Draft

1996 NFL Draft

1997 NFL Draft

1998 NFL Draft

1999 NFL Draft

2000 NFL Draft

2001 NFL Draft

2002 NFL Draft

2003 NFL Draft

2004 NFL Draft

2005 NFL Draft

2006 NFL Draft

2007 NFL Draft

2008 NFL Draft

2009 NFL Draft

2010 NFL Draft

2011 NFL Draft

2012 NFL Draft

2013 NFL Draft

2014 NFL Draft

2015 NFL Draft

2016 NFL Draft

2017 NFL Draft

2018 NFL Draft

2019 NFL Draft

2020 NFL Draft

2021 NFL Draft

2022 NFL Draft

References
San Francisco 49ers draft history at DraftHistory.com

draft history
San Francisco